The Nursing Minimum Data Set (NMDS) is a classification system which allows for the standardized collection of essential nursing data. The collected data are meant to provide an accurate description of the nursing process used when providing nursing care. The NMDS allow for the analysis and comparison of nursing data across populations, settings, geographic areas, and time.

See also 

 Effective therapeutic regimen management
 Minimum Data Set
 NANDA
 Nursing care plan
 Nursing assessment
 Nursing diagnosis
 Nursing Interventions Classification (NIC)
 Nursing Outcomes Classification (NOC)
 Omaha System

References

External links
 

Clinical procedure classification
Nursing informatics
Nursing classification